Munn Lake is a lake in the U.S. state of Washington. The Olympia Regional Airport lies to the southwest of the lake and the community of Bush is situated to the south. Two other bodies of water in the surrounding area, Susan Lake and Trails End Lake, are in near proximity to Munn Lake.

Munn Lake was named after Edwin Munn, a dairy farmer who operated in the area in the early 20th century.

References

Lakes of Thurston County, Washington